Bernd Siebert (born 5 March 1964 in Berlin-Wilmersdorf) is a German mathematician who researches in algebraic geometry.

Life 
Siebert studied mathematics starting 1984 at the University of Erlangen. In 1986, he changed to the University of Bonn and in 1987 to the University of Göttingen where he finished his Diplom in 1989 under the supervision of Hans Grauert with distinction. He became Grauert's PhD student and assistant in Göttingen. He received his PhD in 1992 (Faserzykelräume, geometrische Plattifikation und meromorphe Äquivalenzrelationen). A stay at the Courant Institute followed in 1993–94 after which we went to Bochum. In 1997–98 he spent some time at the MIT as a visiting scholar before completing his habilitation in Bochum in 1998 (Gromov–Witten invariants for general symplectic manifolds). As a DFG-Heisenberg Fellow, he went to the Universität Paris VI/Universität Paris VII from 2000 to 2002. From there, he was called to a professorship at the Albert-Ludwigs-Universität Freiburg in 2002. He moved on to the Universität Hamburg in 2008, and in 2011, he became the head of the Graduiertenkolleg Mathematics Inspired by String Theory and QFT. In 2018, Siebert joined the faculty of the University of Texas at Austin as a professor of mathematics and holds the Sid W. Richardson Foundation Regents Chair in Mathematics #4.

In his research, Bernd Siebert contributed substantially to the theory of Gromov–Witten invariants. Around 2002 by his insights in logarithmic geometry, he entered into an ongoing joint research program with Mark Gross. This generated a sequence of relevant papers that relate to Mirror Symmetry and tropical geometry.

In 2014, jointly with Mark Gross, he became an invited speaker at the International Congress of Mathematics in Seoul for the section complex geometry (Local mirror symmetry in the tropics). Both of them were awarded the Clay Research Award in 2016.

Papers

References

External links 
 Homepage
 Mathematische Genealogie

1964 births
Living people
21st-century German politicians
Courant Institute of Mathematical Sciences alumni
20th-century German mathematicians
People from Wilmersdorf
University of Bonn alumni
University of Erlangen-Nuremberg alumni
21st-century German mathematicians